American Gigolo is a 1980 American neo-noir crime drama film written and directed by Paul Schrader, and starring Richard Gere and Lauren Hutton. It tells the story of a high-priced escort in Los Angeles (Gere) who becomes romantically involved with a prominent politician's wife (Hutton), while simultaneously becoming the prime suspect in a murder case.

The film established Gere as a leading man, and was one of the first mainstream Hollywood films to include frontal male nudity from its main star. It is also notable for its Golden Globe Award–nominated musical score, composed by Giorgio Moroder, and number-one single "Call Me" by Blondie. Schrader considers it one of four similar films, which he calls "double bookends": Taxi Driver, bookended by Light Sleeper, and American Gigolo bookended by The Walker.

Plot
Julian Kay is a male escort in Los Angeles whose clientele is upper-class women. His job supports and requires an expensive taste in cars and clothes, and affords him a luxury Westwood apartment. He is blatantly materialistic, as he strives to merit inclusion into the class of people who make up his clientele. He takes pleasure in his work from being able to sexually satisfy women, offering and selling his body to women.

Julian's procurer, Anne, sends him on an assignment with a wealthy old widow, Mrs. Dobrun, who is visiting town. Afterwards, he goes to the hotel bar and meets Michelle Stratton, a California state senator's wife, who becomes obsessed with him. Julian's pimp Leon sends him to Palm Springs on a "substitute" assignment to the house of Mr. Rheiman, a wealthy financier. Rheiman asks Julian to have sado-masochistic sex with his wife Judy while he is watching them. The next day, Julian berates Leon for sending him to a "rough trick" and makes it clear he declines kinky or gay assignments. Leon warns Julian that the wealthy, older women he serves will turn on him and discard him without a second thought.

As Julian begins to have a relationship with Michelle, he learns that Judy Rheiman has been murdered. Los Angeles Police Department Detective Sunday identifies Julian as the prime suspect. Though Julian was with Lisa Williams, another client, on the night of the murder, she protects her marriage by not providing an alibi for Julian.

Julian discovers evidence about the murder. He realizes that he is being framed and grows increasingly desperate. His clothes become rumpled, he goes unshaven and drives a cheap rental car (after painstakingly searching his Mercedes and finding Judy's jewelry that was planted in it to frame him). He neglects to pick up an important client for Anne that he had been scheduled to escort, angering Anne and causing her to shun him. Julian warns Michelle that he is in trouble and, hoping to protect her, he tells her to leave him alone.

Julian concludes that Leon and Rheiman are the ones trying to frame him, and that one of Leon's other gigolos was the murderer. Julian goes to confront Leon, telling him the truth and trying to clear his name. Leon refuses to help him and remains implacable. In a fit of rage, Julian pushes Leon from the apartment balcony; although Julian immediately regrets his action and tries to save him, Leon nevertheless falls to his death. With no one to help him, Julian ends up in jail, helplessly awaiting trial for Judy's murder. Michelle reconciles with Julian by telling the police that she was with Julian the night of Judy's murder, sacrificing her reputation and marriage to save him.

Cast

Production
Paul Schrader first conceived of the idea for the film while teaching screenwriting at UCLA's film and television department. The script was one of five screenplays Schrader wrote in 1976. Schrader commented, "The character in ‘Taxi Driver’ was compulsively nonsexual. The character in ‘American Gigolo’ is compulsively sexual. He is a man who receives his identity by giving sexual pleasure but has no concept of receiving sexual pleasure.”

John Travolta was originally attached to the lead role, with his casting announced by the Los Angeles Times in January 1978. Travolta was provided a wardrobe by Giorgio Armani and appeared in a photo spread for the trade publication Variety announcing his participation. The following year, Travolta dropped out of the production to deal with his mother's death and father's illness.

In Travolta's absence, Barry Diller of Paramount Pictures offered the part of Julian Kay to Christopher Reeve, but Reeve turned down the million-dollar offer. Chevy Chase was also offered the role but declined. Schrader offered the part to his first choice, Richard Gere, who accepted. Gere was cast two weeks before shooting began. In 2012, Gere said he was drawn to the role partly because of its gay subtext, commenting,

This is not the only role Travolta turned down only to be taken by Gere: it had happened with Days of Heaven (1978) and occurred again when Travolta was offered the lead in An Officer and a Gentleman (1982) and Chicago (2002). Gere's brief nude scenes marked the first time a major Hollywood actor was frontally nude in a film. According to Gere, the nudity was not in the original script.

Julie Christie was originally cast in the role of Michelle Stratton but her departure was precipitated by Gere's replacement of Travolta. By the time Gere was cast, Lauren Hutton had already been hired. Meryl Streep was also offered the part of Michelle but declined because she did not like the tone of the film. Glenn Close also auditioned for a role when Travolta was still attached.

Schrader called Pickpocket (1959) by the French director Robert Bresson an influence on the film; the composition of the final shot pays homage to that film, as does the final dialogue. Schrader later provided an introduction to the Criterion Collection DVD of Pickpocket. On the film's ending, Schrader writes: "At the end of American Gigolo, I wanted to perversely plunge my lizardy protagonist into icy Bressonian waters, so I lifted the ending of Pickpocket and gave it to Julian Kay. A grace note as unwarranted as Christ's promise to the thief on the cross". Schrader re-visited many of the themes of American Gigolo in his 2007 film The Walker and says the idea for that film came about while wondering what would have become of the Julian Kay character.

The film is widely credited to have established the Giorgio Armani brand in Hollywood because the Italian designer's clothes are featured prominently in Julian Kay's wardrobe.

Filming began on 13 February 1979 and lasted until April 1979.

Soundtrack

The film's musical score was composed by Giorgio Moroder, who was nominated for the Golden Globe Award for Best Original Score. The main theme song of the film is "Call Me" performed by Blondie. The song was written by Moroder and Blondie vocalist Debbie Harry, and became a huge worldwide success in 1980. It peaked at number one in several countries including the US and the UK, and became the highest-selling single of 1980 in the United States. In 1981, the song was also nominated for a Grammy Award for Best Rock Performance by a Duo or Group with Vocal. Moroder and Harry further shared a nomination for the Golden Globe Award for Best Original Song.

Reception
Roger Ebert gave the film 3.5 stars out of 4, writing, "The whole movie has a winning sadness about it; take away the story's sensational aspects and what you have is a study in loneliness." Gene Siskel of the Chicago Tribune also awarded 3.5 stars out of 4 and called it "an honest, compelling drama that sheds a little light in some beguilingly dark places." Vincent Canby of The New York Times wrote in a negative review that writer-director Schrader "is awfully good at establishing inarticulate, unknowing, self-deluding characters, but he's much less effective when it comes to shepherding these characters through the contingencies of the melodrama that is supposed to ennoble them or, at least, to reveal their unsuspected moral resources." Variety faulted the film for an "evasiveness at its core," finding a "moral and emotional ambivalence" in Gere's character "which makes caring about his predicament and ultimate fate difficult." Charles Champlin of the Los Angeles Times was also negative, calling the film "such an improbable tissue of fantasies and dime-novel borrowings that from moment to moment it seems to be making fun of itself, although the joke is disguised perfectly." Roger Angell of The New Yorker wrote that the film "presents a humorless, Penthouse kind of sex, all dolled up with expensive 'real' settings, foreign cars, hi-fi sets, and designer clothes, but barely alive at its glum, soft core."

Television series

In October 2014, Jerry Bruckheimer announced plans to adapt the film into a television series. In October 2016, it was announced that Neil Labute will write the series for Showtime. On June 15, 2021, Showtime gave production series order consists of ten episodes. David Hollander will be writing, directing, and showrunning the series. He is also expected to executive produced alongside Jerry Bruckheimer, Jonathan Littman, and KristieAnne Reed. Jon Bernthal, Rosie O’Donnell, Lizzie Brocheré, and Leland Orser were cast in starring roles while Wayne Brady was cast to guest star.

See also
 American Gigolo (soundtrack)
 Male prostitution
 Gigolo
 Male prostitution in the arts
 Female sex tourism
 Romantic Noy

References

External links
 
 
 

1980 films
1980 crime drama films
1980s erotic drama films
1980s mystery drama films
American crime drama films
American erotic drama films
American mystery drama films
American neo-noir films
1980s English-language films
Erotic mystery films
Fictional portrayals of the Los Angeles Police Department
Films adapted into television shows
Films about male prostitution in the United States
Films directed by Paul Schrader
Films produced by Jerry Bruckheimer
Films scored by Giorgio Moroder
Films set in Los Angeles
Films shot in Los Angeles
Films with screenplays by Paul Schrader
Paramount Pictures films
1980s American films